This is a list of what are intended to be the notable top hotels by country, five or four star hotels, notable skyscraper landmarks or historic hotels which are covered in multiple reliable publications.

Iceland
Hótel Búðir, Snaefellsnes peninsula

India

Indonesia
Jakarta
 Hotel Indonesia Kempinski, Central Jakarta
 JW Marriott Jakarta, South Jakarta

Medan
 Inna Dharma Deli Hotel

Surabaya
 Hotel Majapahit

Iran

 Abbasi Hotel, Isfahan
 Dariush Grand Hotel, Kish Island
 Parsian Azadi Hotel, Tehran

Iraq

 Al-Fanar Hotel, Baghdad
 Al Rasheed Hotel, Baghdad
 Babel Hotel, Baghdad
 Baghdad Hotel, Baghdad
 Basrah Sheraton, Basra
 Erbil International Hotel, Arbil
 Ishtar Sheraton Hotel, Baghdad
 Khanzad Hotel, Arbil
 Mansour Hotel, Baghdad
 Palestine Hotel, Baghdad

Ireland

 Adare Manor
 Ashford Castle
 Barberstown Castle
 Bellinter House
 The Belvedere Hotel, Dublin
 The Butler Arms Hotel
 Carton House
 Clarion Hotel, Limerick
 Clontarf Castle
 Dromoland Castle
 Dunbrody Country House Hotel
 Four Seasons Hotel Dublin
 Gresham Hotel
 Hayes' Hotel
 K Club
 Merrion Hotel
 Mornington House
 Mount Herbert Hotel
 Moy House
 Shelbourne Hotel

Israel

 American Colony Hotel, Jerusalem
David Citadel Hotel, Jerusalem
Inbal Jerusalem Hotel, Jerusalem
 Isrotel Tower, Tel Aviv
 Jerusalem Gate Hotel, Jerusalem
 King David Hotel, Jerusalem
 Leonardo City Tower Hotel, Ramat Gan
 Leonardo Plaza Hotel Jerusalem, Jerusalem
 Mount of Olives Hotel, Jerusalem
 Seven Arches Hotel, Jerusalem
 The Shepherd Hotel, Jerusalem
 Vered Hagalil, Sea of Galilee

Italy

 Grand Hotel des Bains, Venice
 Grand Hotel Quisisana, Capri
 The Grand Hotel Rimini, Rimini
 Hotel Caruso, Ravello
 Hotel Cipriani, Venice
 Hotel Danieli, Venice
 Hotel Florida Milan, Milan
 Hotel Splendido, Portofino
 Hotel Terme Millepini
 JK Place Capri, Capri
 Palazzo Dandolo, Venice
 Rosa Grand, Milan
 Royal Victoria Hotel, Pisa
 Savoia Excelsior Palace, Trieste
 Splendid Venice, Venice
 Starhotels Anderson, Milan
 Torre di Moravola, Umbria
 Town House Galleria, Milan
 Villa d'Este, Cernobbio, Lake Como
 Villa San Michele Hotel, Florence

Sicily
 Kempinski Hotel Giardino di Costanza, near Mazara del Vallo

References

I